Purificacion "Pura" Villanueva Kalaw (27 August 1886 – 21 March 1954) was a Filipina beauty queen, feminist, journalist, and writer.

Early life
Purificacion Garcia Villanueva was born in the town of Arevalo, Iloilo to Emilio Villanueva and Emilia Garcia. Her mother was born in Palencia, Spain. In 1908, at age 22, Pura Villanueva became the first "Queen of the Manila Carnival."

Career
In 1906 Pura Villanueva organized a suffrage group, the Asociacion Feminista Ilongga. Her efforts led to the first suffrage bill reaching the Philippine Assembly in 1907. Pura Villanueva wrote a column for the weekly newspaper El Tiempo, and edited the woman's page. Later she edited the Spanish-language section of Woman's Outlook, a pro-suffrage publication (Trinidad Fernandez Legarda was the English-language editor). She was also president of the Women's Club of Manila.

Books by Pura Villanueva Kalaw included Osmeña From Newspaperman to President (1946), How the Filipina Got the Vote, Outstanding Filipino Women, Anthology of Filipino Women Writers, The Consumer Cooperatives in the Philippines, The Filipino Cookbook, and A Brief History of the Filipino Flag. Her 1918 booklet Condimentos Indigenas was "one of the earliest cookbooks" published in the Philippines.

In 1951, Pura Villanueva Kalaw was honored with a Presidential Medal, presented by President Elpidio Quirino, for her work on behalf of women's rights in the Philippines.

Personal life
Pura Villanueva married lawyer and editor Teodoro Maniguiat Kalaw in 1910. Their children included Maria Kalaw Katigbak, a senator, and Purita Kalaw Ledesma, an art critic. Their daughter-in-law Eva Estrada Kalaw was also a senator. Pura Villanueva Kalaw became a widow in 1940. She died on 21 March 1954 at the age of 67.

Her daughter Maria Kalaw Katigbak published a biography, Legacy: Pura Villanueva Kalaw: Her Times, Life, and Works 1886–1954 in 1983. Pura V. Kalaw was one of the suffragists featured in a 2016 exhibit at the Philippine Embassy in Washington, D.C.

There is a school in Quezon City named for Pura V. Kalaw.

References

1886 births
1954 deaths
Filipino women writers
Filipino beauty pageant winners
Filipino columnists
Filipino women's rights activists
Filipino people of Spanish descent
People from Iloilo City
Writers from Iloilo
Visayan people
Filipino women columnists
People of Spanish colonial Philippines